Enzkreis is a Landkreis (district) in the northwest of Baden-Württemberg, Germany. Neighboring districts are (from west clockwise) Karlsruhe, Heilbronn, Ludwigsburg, Böblingen and Calw. The district-free Pforzheim area in the south is nearly completely surrounded by Enz.

History
The district was created in 1973, when the previous district Pforzheim was merged with parts of the neighboring districts Vaihingen, Leonberg and Calw. Some part of the district Pforzheim was included into the city Pforzheim.

The district Pforzheim dates back to 1939, when the Bezirksamt Pforzheim was split into the district and the district-free city.

Geography
The south of the Enz district covers the northern part of the Black Forest. In the north-west of the district is the Kraichgau, a mainly agricultural area. The main river is the Enz, a tributary of the Neckar.

International relations

Twin towns — Sister cities
Since March 1993 the district has an official partnership with the Italian province Reggio Emilia. Since 1996 the district has a partnership with the Polish city Mysłowice. As two municipalities left the city in a communal reform in 1995, the partnership also includes Imielin and Chelm Slaski. In March 2001 the Enz district together with the city Pforzheim started a friendship with the Hungarian Komitat Györ-Moson-Sopron.

Coat of arms
The four diamonds in the coat of arms represent the four historic territories covered by the district: the Black Forest, the Heckengäu, Kraichgau and Stromberg. The wavy line in the middle represent the river Enz, which also gave the name to the district.

Cities and towns

References

External links

Official website (German)

 
Karlsruhe (region)
Districts of Baden-Württemberg